Ken Shields may refer to:

Ken Shields (basketball), basketball coach
Ken Shields, lead singer of the 1980s Canadian rock band Streetheart